Poliosia cubitifera is a moth in the family Erebidae. It was described by George Hampson in 1894. It is found in the Indian states of Sikkim and Assam.

References

Moths described in 1894
Lithosiina